Salavan (ສາລະວັນ) is the capital of Salavan Province in southern Laos. It is also a provincial district. It is 125 km from Pakse on a partially paved road.

Geography
Salavan is in the southernmost area of Laos, one of the most isolated regions of the country. The city is in a densely forested area that has seen little development outside the city. Dozens of indigenous villages of various tribes surround Salavan.

Culture
Salavan's local culture is influenced by the Lao Loum, lowland Lao who form the majority of the population of both the city and country, as well as hill tribe and former colonial French cultures. Salavan is starting to become a popular backpacking destination for tourists in Indochina and has a "frontier town"-like feel because of the dearth of settlements outside the city. Salavan is known for its version of Lao dance, which has spread to throughout the entire nation. The Lao language is the most spoken language in the city. French is also spoken by a minority, a legacy of the French colonial rule.

References

Populated places in Salavan Province